Remembering Christmas is an album by American pianist David Benoit released by GRP Records in 1996. The album reached #15 on Billboard's Contemporary Jazz chart.

Track listing
"Skating" (Vince Guaraldi, Lee Mendelson) - 4:40
"Santa Claus Is Coming to Town" (John Frederick Coots, Haven Gillespie) - 4:47
"Angels We Have Heard on High" (Traditional) - 4:32
"Christmas Time Is Here" (Vince Guaraldi, Lee Mendelson) - 4:09
"Jesu, Joy of Man's Desiring" (Johann Sebastian Bach) - 3:07
"Hark! The Herald Angels Sing" (Charles Wesley, Felix Mendelssohn) - 4:28
"Do You Hear What I Hear" (Gloria Shayne Baker, Noel Regney) - 4:36
"Christmas Is Coming" (Vince Guaraldi) - 3:53
"Silent Night" (Franz Xaver Gruber, Joseph Mohr) - 4:02
"Remembering Christmas" (David Benoit) - 4:35
"The First Noel" (Traditional) - 4:16
"The Christmas Song" (Mel Torme, Robert Wells) - 3:10

Personnel 
 David Benoit – acoustic piano, keyboards, arrangements
 Dave Brubeck – acoustic piano
 Earl Klugh – guitar
 Robert Benoit – guitar
 John Pattitucci – bass
 Ernest Tibbs III – bass
 Harvey Mason – drums
 Tony Morales – drums
 Gary Novak – drums
 Brad Dutz – percussion
 Michael Franks – vocals

Production 
 David Benoit – producer 
 Clark Germain – engineer, mixing
 Tom Mark – assistant engineer
 Eddie Miller – assistant engineer
 Luis Jose Rodriguez – assistant engineer
 Ken Ross – assistant engineer
 Elliot Schiener – mixing 
 Bernie Grundman – mastering at Bernie Grundman Mastering (Hollywood, CA).
 Ken Gruberman – music preparation
 Diana Mich Newell – project coordinator 
 Jason Claiborne – graphic design 
 Hollis King – art direction 
 Tracy Lamonica – photography

Charts

References

External links
David Benoit-Remembering Christmas at AllMusic

1996 Christmas albums
David Benoit (musician) albums
GRP Records albums
Christmas albums by American artists
Jazz Christmas albums